Marlene is a 2000 German biopic film directed by Joseph Vilsmaier and starring Katja Flint, Hans Werner Meyer and Herbert Knaup. It follows the life of the German actress Marlene Dietrich and her success in Hollywood.

Cast

Cited films
The movie contains "episodes" of the following films:

The Blue Angel (1930)
Morocco (1930)
The Scarlet Empress (1934)

References

External links

2000s historical films
German historical films
German biographical films
Films directed by Joseph Vilsmaier
Films scored by Harald Kloser
Films set in the United States
Biographical films about actors
Films set in the 1920s
Films set in the 1930s
Films set in the 1940s
Films set in the 1960s
Cultural depictions of Marlène Dietrich
Cultural depictions of Mae West
Cultural depictions of Maurice Chevalier
2000s German-language films
2000s German films